Wismar is a railway station in the town of Wismar, Mecklenburg-Vorpommern, Germany. The station lies on the Ludwigslust–Wismar railway and Wismar–Rostock railway and the train services are operated by Deutsche Bahn.

History  

After construction of the Schwerin–Wismar railway, a station was needed at the terminus. The chosen site offered convenient access to the port of Wismar. By the end of 1847, the first buildings were built, two sheds for materials and a kyanizing works. Later a roundhouse, a carriage shed, a tool shed and a coke store and a coke oven were added. It was estimated that the construction of the planned entrance building would cost about 28,500 Thalers.

When the railway line was inaugurated in 1848, the roundhouse had been completed, there was also a cattle ramp and a large turntable. By 1857 the carriage shed was used as an entrance building and goods shed. There was a station forecourt and a promenade that ran from Lindengarten to the harbour.  There was a railway hotel next to the station. The former water tower is still standing. The station's system of tracks and the station building were extended between 1884 and 1894. Parking spaces for coaches, private carriages and buses were to be built outside the station according to a plan of 1896. An underpass for pedestrians was constructed around the turn of the century.

Rolling stock were produced at the nearby Waggonfabrik Wismar factory in Wismar from 1894 to 1947.

Train services
The station is served by the following services:

References

Railway stations in Mecklenburg-Western Pomerania
Buildings and structures in Nordwestmecklenburg
Railway stations in Germany opened in 1848
Station